Hakizimana Yussuf known as Kebby Boy is a Burundian singer and songwriter of pop, rap and afrobeats, currently signed to IBN Music France. He is best known for his single "Sina Lawama", a song mixing the pop style and the afro pop style.

Biography and career 
Kebby Boy was born in the province of Rumonge, Burundi, where he completed his primary and secondary education. Kebby composed a song titled Tonya the penzi which iwa arranged by Roméo the producer of kirimba art studio in 2007. He started his professional career by recording the songs in the studio, and released his first single named Chozi Langu in 2008. He studied at the Islamic technical high school in Burundi and holds a national diploma.

After the release of his single Wanyama Pori, it was presented to the director of the label. On 10 January 2016, he signed to the Light Entertainment Company label with which he recorded songs like My Dodo, Sina Lawama etc. in the Wasafi Records studio of the Tanzanian pop star Diamond Platnumz.

Discography

Singles

Studio albums
NALIA (2011)
SINA LAWAMA (2016)
NDACARIHO EP (2020)
OURANIA EP (2022)

Awards

AEAUSA

|-
| rowspan="1"|2018
|Kebby Boy
|Upcoming Artist
|
|-

PLATFORMSHOW MUSIC AWARDS

|-
| rowspan="1"|2021
|Kebby Boy
|Best Diaspora
|
|-
| rowspan="1"|2022
|Kebby Boy
|Best Diaspora
|

References

External links
Kebby Boy on TW
Kebby Boy on FB
Kebby Boy on YT
Kebby Boy on IG

Living people
Burundian male singers
Year of birth missing (living people)